Middlesex North was a federal electoral district in Ontario, Canada, that was represented in the House of Commons of Canada from 1867 to 1917. It was created by the British North America Act of 1867 which divided the County of Middlesex into three ridings: the Middlesex North, Middlesex West and Middlesex East.

The North Riding consisted of the Townships of McGillivray and Biddulph (taken from the County of Huron), and Williams East, Williams West, Adelaide, and Lobo.

In 1882, it was redefined add the township of Stephen and the villages of Ailsa Craig, Lucan, Exeter and Parkhill, and to exclude the townships of Adelaide and Lobo.

In 1903, it was redefined to consist of the townships of Adelaide, Biddulph, Lobo, McGillivray, Williams East and Williams West, the town of Parkhill and the villages of Ailsa Craig and Lucan.

The electoral district was abolished in 1914 when it was redistributed between Middlesex East and Middlesex West ridings.

Electoral history

On Mr. Scatcherd's death, 15 April 1876:

See also 

 List of Canadian federal electoral districts
 Past Canadian electoral districts

External links 
 Parliamentary website

Former federal electoral districts of Ontario